Wiley Lee Housewright, EdD (17 October 1913 Wylie, Texas – 13 December 2003 Tallahassee) was an American music educator and longtime dean of music at Florida State University.

Career highlights 
 1934–1941: Director of Music, public schools in Texas and New York
 1942–1943: Lecturer of Music, New York University
 1946–1947: Assistant Professor of Music, The University of Texas at Austin
 1947–1980: Professor of Music, School of Music, Florida State University, Tallahassee
 1961–1962: Distinguished professor, Florida State University, Tallahassee
 1966–1979: Dean, School of Music, Florida State University, Tallahassee
 1968–1970: President, Music Educators National Conference (MENC)

Formal education 
 1934: Bachelor of Science, University of North Texas, Denton
 1938: Master of Arts, Columbia University, New York City
 1943: EdD, New York University, New York City

See also 
 The Housewright Symposium / Vision 2020
 Tanglewood Symposium

External links 
 Wiley L. Housewright papers, Special Collections in Performing Arts, University of Maryland Libraries.

References 

1913 births
2003 deaths
University of North Texas College of Music alumni
Florida State University faculty
Columbia University alumni
Steinhardt School of Culture, Education, and Human Development alumni
American music educators
Music of Texas